Cerithium salebrosum is a species of sea snail, a marine gastropod mollusk in the family Cerithiidae.

Description
Cerithium salebrosum has a spiraling conical shell that can be colored white, gray, black, or brown.

Distribution
The distribution of Cerithium salebrosum includes the Western Central Pacific.
 Indonesia
 Guam

References

Cerithiidae
Gastropods described in 1855